Ian Edward Swainson Jones (22 September 1931 – 31 August 2018) was an Australian television writer and director and an author specialising in the history of notorious outlaw Ned Kelly and his gang.

Career 
Jones had a long career in Australian television, and is best remembered for his writing and directing work at Crawford Productions on shows such as Homicide, Matlock Police, The Bluestone Boys and The Sullivans, and for Against the Wind, a highly successful mini-series, created in collaboration with Bronwyn Binns, which explored Australia's convict past.

Jones and his wife Bronwyn Binns created a portrayal of Ned Kelly and his associates when they produced the mini-series, The Last Outlaw, which was shown in 1980. He also wrote several reference books about the Kelly gang including the bestseller Ned Kelly: A Short Life and The Fatal Friendship: Ned Kelly, Aaron Sherritt and Joe Byrne. In his work, Jones draws extensively on oral history interviews with descendants of the members of the Kelly Gang, in addition to decades of archival research. Jones also co-wrote the screenplay for the 1970 biopic film Ned Kelly which starred Mick Jagger.

Jones died in Melbourne on 31 August 2018.

Honours 
In December 2006, Ian Jones was awarded the Longford Lyell Award by the Australian Film Institute in recognition of his enduring contribution to Australian screen culture.

Works

Booklets

Published scripts

Contributed chapters
"The Kellys and Beechworth", "Kelly the folk hero" and "A new view of Ned Kelly" In: Ned Kelly: Man and Myth edited by Colin F. Cave, Melbourne : Cassell (1968)
"Guns of the Kelly Story" and "The Kelly Armour: Fact and Fantasy" in: The Last Outlaw by Les Carlyon, Melbourne, VIC : HSV7 (1980)

Introductions
 In: The Ned Kelly Encyclopaedia by Justin Corfield, South Melbourne, VIC : Lothian, (2003)

References

External links
Ian Jones at IMDb

1931 births
2018 deaths
Australian screenwriters
Australian television directors
Australian television writers
Australian historians
People educated at Carey Baptist Grammar School
People from Newcastle, New South Wales
Australian male television writers